Ram Bahadur Limboo is an Indian politician. He was elected to the Sikkim Legislative Assembly from Soreng-Chakung in the 2014 Sikkim Legislative Assembly election as a member of the Sikkim Democratic Front.

Personal life
Limboo was born to Hema Karna Limboo and hails from Soreng in West Sikkim district of Sikkim. He obtained his Bachelor of Arts and LLB degrees from North Bengal University in 1983.

Political career
Limbo won the 2014 Sikkim Legislative Assembly election from the Soreng-Chakung constituency as a member of the Sikkim Democratic Front with 6,596 votes, constituting 56.5% of the total vote share. He defeated Bharati Sharma of Sikkim Krantikari Morcha by a margin of 1,929 votes.

References

1950s births
Living people
Sikkim MLAs 2014–2019
Sikkim Democratic Front politicians
People from Gyalshing district
Year of birth missing (living people)
Limbu people